Christopher Glombard (born 5 June 1989) is a French-born Martiniquais international footballer who currently plays for the Martinique national team. He plays as a right back and is a former French youth international having earned caps at under-18 and under-19 level. Glombard is the younger brother of Luigi Glombard, who is also a football player and plays for Championnat National club Niort.

Career
Prior to joining Reims on loan, Glombard was captain of the Bordeaux reserve team. On 28 May 2010, Bordeaux announced that the player would be joining Reims for the entire 2010–11 season alongside teammate Grzegorz Krychowiak. He made his professional debut on 13 August in a league match against Le Mans.

References

External links
 
 
 

Living people
1989 births
French people of Martiniquais descent
Sportspeople from Montreuil, Seine-Saint-Denis
Association football fullbacks
French footballers
France youth international footballers
Martiniquais footballers
Martinique international footballers
FC Girondins de Bordeaux players
Stade de Reims players
Alki Oroklini players
Tours FC players
Ligue 1 players
Ligue 2 players
Championnat National players
2014 Caribbean Cup players
Footballers from Seine-Saint-Denis

id:Matthieu Fontaine